Dominique Zeigler (born October 11, 1984) is a former American football wide receiver. He was initially signed by the 49ers as an undrafted free agent in 2007.  He played college football at Baylor. His nickname among players and fans is "Ziggy".

2007 Season

Zeigler was originally signed by the Niners on May 3, 2007; waived on August 26; then re-signed to the practice squad on September 2, where he spent the entire season.

On January 14, 2008, Zeigler was signed as a free agent to the Niners' roster.

2008 Season

On August 31, 2008, Zeigler was waived by the Niners and then signed again by the Niners on September 3 and placed on their practice squad. On November 8, he was signed to the active roster and subsequently played in eight regular season games, making five catches for 97 yards and no touchdowns.

2009 Season

On September 5, 2009, Zeigler was again waived and then signed to the practice squad the next day. On January 6, 2010, Zeigler was signed to the active roster.

2010 Season

Zeigler played in 11 regular season games, making nine catches for 98 yards and no touchdowns before being placed on season-ending injured reserve on November 30 due to a torn anterior cruciate ligament in his left knee. The injury was sustained the night before during the Niners' 27-6 road win against the Arizona Cardinals.

He was released by the 49ers on September 3, 2011.

References

External links
Baylor Bears bio
San Francisco 49ers bio

1984 births
Living people
Sportspeople from Kalamazoo, Michigan
American football wide receivers
Baylor Bears football players
San Francisco 49ers players